Iréne Slättengren (born 18 May 1952) is a Swedish former equestrian and audiologist. She won gold medals in the individual championship test grade II and individual freestyle test grade II dressage events at the 2004 Summer Olympics in Athens.

Personal life
Slättengren is from Linköping, Sweden. As a youngstar, she contracted polio which caused a spinal cord injury. Aside from equestrianism, Slättengren has worked as an audiologist at Linköping University Hospital.

Career
Slättengren started competing in 1997, and trained at Linköpings RS. At the 2004 Summer Olympics, Slättengren competed on the horse Larino, as her own horse was injured. She won both the individual championship test grade II and individual freestyle test grade II events. She was the first Paralympic medallist from Linköping, and was aged 52 at the time. Slättengren also had the third best individual performance in the team event, and the Swedish team finished fourth.

Slättengren competed at the 2007 World Para Dressage Championships, and was considered one of the favourites. She failed to qualify for the 2008 Summer Paralympics as her horse Mauritz was injured during the selection trials. Carolin Rutberg was selected instead.

References

External links

1952 births
Living people
Swedish female equestrians
Paralympic equestrians of Sweden
Medalists at the 2004 Summer Paralympics
Paralympic gold medalists for Sweden
Audiologists
Sportspeople from Linköping
Sportspeople from Östergötland County
20th-century Swedish women
21st-century Swedish women